Christl Arena is a 5,043-seat, multi-purpose arena in West Point, New York. It was built in 1985 as part of the Major Donald W. Holleder Center, which also houses Tate Rink. It is home to the United States Military Academy's Army Black Knights men's and women's basketball teams. It was named after 1st Lieutenant Edward C. Christl Jr. '44, a former basketball captain who was killed in combat in Austria during World War II while serving with the 65th Infantry Division. Maj. Holleder, '56, the namesake of the athletic center, was an All-American football and basketball player killed in combat in Vietnam in 1967.

The arena hosted portions of the 1995 and 1999 Patriot League men's basketball tournaments, as well as portions of the 2006 and 2008 Patriot League women's basketball tournament, including the 2006 Patriot League championship game, as Army defeated Holy Cross, clinching the first Division I NCAA Tournament bid in program history.

Top 12 Christl Arena crowds
5,195 Navy 8  Feb 2014
5,178 Navy 22 Jan 2011
5,163 Navy 20 Feb 2010
5,125 	Navy 	   28 Feb 2004
5,102 	Navy 	   17 Feb 1995
5,055 	Duke 	   16 Nov 1997
5,043 Navy 19 Jan 2019
5,039 	Navy 	   15 Feb 1994
5,025 	Navy 24 Feb 1990
4,462 	Navy 	   31 Jan 2003
4,256 	Navy 	   23 Feb 2002
4,164 	Lafayette 9 Feb 1990

See also
Gillis Field House
List of indoor arenas in the United States#Major college indoor arenas
List of NCAA Division I basketball arenas

References

College basketball venues in the United States
Indoor arenas in New York (state)
Army Black Knights men's basketball
Army Black Knights women's basketball
Basketball venues in New York (state)
Sports venues in Orange County, New York
Sports venues completed in 1985
1985 establishments in New York (state)